Pataliputra Lok Sabha constituency is one of the 543 parliamentary constituencies in India. The constituency is located in Patna district in Bihar. Until 2008, there was only one Lok Sabha seat for Patna, capital of Bihar. In the reorganization effected that year, the city was awarded two seats, named Pataliputra (after the city's ancient name) and Patna Sahib. Pataliputra constituency has a total of 16.5 lakh electorate out of which 3 lakh are Yadavs, 3 lakh are Bhumihar, 1 lakh for Brahman and Rajput 1 lakh and 3.5 lakh Luv Kush  voter

Assembly constituencies
Assembly constituencies in Pataliputra (Lok Sabha constituency):

Members of Parliament

1952-1957
As Pataliputra Lok Sabha constituency.

1957-2008
See Patna Lok Sabha constituency.

2008-Present
In 2008, the erstwhile Patna Lok Sabha constituency was divided into Pataliputra Lok Sabha and Patna Sahib Lok Sabha.

Election results

General election 2019

General election 2014

General election 2009

See also
 List of constituencies of the Lok Sabha
 Patna (Lok Sabha constituency)
 Patna Sahib (Lok Sabha constituency)

References

External links
Pataliputra lok sabha constituency election 2019 result details

Lok Sabha constituencies in Bihar
Politics of Patna district
2009 establishments in Bihar
Constituencies established in 2009